Riverbend is a 1989 film directed by Sam Firstenberg.  The screenplay was written by Samuel Vance, who produced the film.

Plot
Three rebellious African-American army officers disobey orders in Vietnam and refuse to destroy a village inhabited with innocent people. They are sent to Georgia and are going to be court-martialed. The officers know that justice will not be served and manage to escape. The fugitives end up in the small town of Riverbend, taking refuge in the home of a sympathetic widow. The town is controlled by a brutal, racist sheriff who kills those opposing him and takes whatever he wants from the terrified residents. This bothers one of the officers who, with plans to take down the sheriff, convinces the others to help him create a secret training camp in the woods. They then begin recruiting the local African-Americans men and training them for combat. When they are prepared, the angry rebels take over the town, incarcerate the sheriff and all his cohorts and hold the rest of the town hostage in a church until their demands for media attention and an end to racism are met.

Principal cast

Availability
Although the film is not available on DVD, it can be found on VHS on sites such as Amazon.com.

References

External links 

The official trailer for Riverbend

1989 films
1980s action thriller films
Films set in 1966
Films set in Georgia (U.S. state)
Films set in Vietnam
Films shot in Texas
American independent films
Films about race and ethnicity
Vietnam War films
Films directed by Sam Firstenberg
1980s American films
1990s American films